The 2021 Calderdale Metropolitan Borough Council election took place on 6 May 2021 to elect members of Calderdale Metropolitan Borough Council in England. This was on the same day as other local elections. One-third of the seats were up for election.

The election was originally scheduled for 7 May 2020, alongside the later cancelled 2020 West Yorkshire Police and Crime Commissioner election and other local elections across the UK, but was delayed for a year due to the COVID-19 pandemic.

Council results

Note that due to by-elections being run in some wards, electors in those wards had two votes. This means the change in percentage of votes is not representative of the true swing.

Council Composition
Prior to the election the composition of the council was:

After the election the composition of the council was:

Ward results

Brighouse 

The incumbent Scott Benton for the Conservative Party, who stood down at this election upon his election as a Member of Parliament in 2019.

Colin Peel, initially elected for the Conservative Party but defected to Change UK in the summer of 2019, but sought re-election as an Independent.

Calder 

The incumbent was Josh Fenton-Glynn for the Labour Party. The swing is expressed between Labour and Conservative. The swing was 21.31% from Liberal Democrat who  were second in 2016 to Labour.

Elland 

The incumbent was Pat Allen for the Liberal Democrats.

Greetland and Stainland 

The incumbents were Marilyn Greenwood for the Liberal Democrats who died in February 2021, and Paul Bellenger for the Liberal Democrats.

Hipperholme and Lightcliffe 

The incumbent was George Robinson for the Conservative Party.

Illingworth and Mixenden 

The incumbent was Lisa Lambert for the Labour Party who stood down at this election. There was a swing of 19.2% from UKIP, who did not stand this time, to the Conservatives.

Luddendenfoot 

The incumbent was Jane Scullion for the Labour Party.

Northowram and Shelf 

The incumbent was Peter Caffrey for the Conservative Party.
The swing is expressed between Conservative & Labour who were second in 2016. It was 10.7% from Conservative to Green.

Ovenden 

The incumbent was Anne Collins for the Labour Party who stood down at this election.

Park 

The incumbent was Jenny Lynn for the Labour Party.

Rastrick 

The incumbent was Sophie Whittaker for the Conservative Party.

Ryburn 

The incumbent was Geraldine Carter for the Conservative Party who stood down at this election. Robert Thornber had previously held one of the other seats in this ward but lost to an independent candidate in 2019.

Skircoat 

The incumbent was John Hardy for the Conservative Party who stood down at this election.

Sowerby Bridge 

The incumbent was Adam Wilkinson for the Labour Party.

Todmorden 

The incumbent was Steve Sweeney for the Labour Party who stood down at this election.

Town 

The incumbent was Megan Swift for the Labour Party.

Warley 

The incumbent was Ashley Evans for the Liberal Democrats.

By-elections between 2021 and 2022

Park ward, 2021

The incumbent was Mohammad Naeem for Labour who had died in July.

Ryburn ward, 2021

The incumbent was Rob Holden, an Independent, who had resigned for health reasons.

References 

2021
Calderdale
2020s in West Yorkshire